Elizabeth Hester Douglas-Home, Baroness Home of the Hirsel (6 November 1909 – 3 September 1990) was the wife of British politician and prime minister Alec Douglas-Home.

Biography
She was born Elizabeth Hester Alington, the second daughter of the Very Rev Cyril Alington—headmaster of Shrewsbury School and Eton College successively, as well as chaplain to King George V—and his wife, Hester Margaret Lyttelton, daughter of George Lyttelton, 4th Baron Lyttelton. Elizabeth was the first woman to become a fellow (governor) of Eton.

She married Alec Douglas-Home on 3 October 1936. Thanks to her husband acquiring and renouncing various titles, she had, according to The Guinness Book of Records, more names successively in her lifetime than any other once-married, British-only woman.

The couple had four children:
 Lady (Lavinia) Caroline Douglas-Home DL (b. 11 Oct 1937), who served as a Lady-in-Waiting to various members of the Royal Family
 Lady Meriel Kathleen Douglas-Home (b. 27 Nov 1939), m. Adrian Darby, Bursar of Keble College, Oxford
 Lady Diana Lucy Douglas-Home (b. 18 Dec 1940), m. James Wolfe Murray
 David Alexander Cospatrick Douglas-Home, 15th Earl of Home (20 Nov 1943-22 Aug 2022).

She died on 3 September 1990 at the age of 80. Her husband outlived her by just over five years. They had been married for 53 years.

References

Bibliography

External links
 
 

1909 births
1990 deaths
Spouses of prime ministers of the United Kingdom
Home of the Hirsel
Home
Spouses of life peers
Wives of knights